Meheti'a or Me'eti'a is a volcanic island in the Windward Islands, in the east of the Society Islands in French Polynesia. It belongs to the Teahiti'a-Mehetia hotspot.

The peak is a well-defined volcanic crater. In 1981 the island was the centre of earthquakes.

History

Tahitian oral tradition holds that navigators stopped at Mehiti'a, which was regarded as sacred, on their long voyage to New Zealand. This oral history correlates with geological evidence found in southern New Zealand which can be traced back to Mehiti'a.

The early Polynesian voyagers commonly gave Polynesian ancestral names and symbolism to new places.  The high point of Mehetia is Mount Hiurai (Hi’ura’i/Hikurangi) The name Hikurangi in Aotearoa / New Zealand probably came from Mehetia and the name Hi’ura’i probably has its origin in Si'ulagi (Si'ulangi) in Ta'u, Samoa.

The first European sighting was by the Spanish expedition of Pedro Fernández de Quirós on 9 February 1606, that charted it as Decena (ten in Spanish). Later on it was sighted by Samuel Wallis in  HMS Dolphin 1767 and Louis Antoine de Bougainville in 1768. It was also sighted by Spanish navigator Domingo de Boenechea on November 6, 1772, on ship Aguila. He named this island San Cristóbal.

Administration
Meheti'a is administratively part of the commune (municipality) of Taiarapu-Est and of its easternmost commune associée Tautira. The island is uninhabited and does not have much vegetation but has a small coral reef on the underwater slopes.

See also

 List of volcanoes in French Polynesia

References

External links

 Mehetia in Smithsonian Institution Global Volcanism Program database

Volcanoes of French Polynesia
Stratovolcanoes of France
Active volcanoes
Islands of the Society Islands
Uninhabited islands of French Polynesia